Sierra Vista High School  is a nine-month school year term public high school located in Spring Valley, Nevada, United States. Sierra Vista is a part of the Clark County School District.

Principal history
Bill Garis (2001-2003)
Emil Wozniak (2004-2007)
Shawn P. Boyle (2008-2015)
John Anzalone (2015 -2021 )
Jessica Lee Lovel (2022 -Present)

Athletics

Sierra Vista High School competes in the Sunset 4A Region.

Fall sports: Boys & Girls Cross Country, Football, Boys Golf, Boys & Girls Soccer, Boys & Girls Tennis, and Girls Volleyball.
Winter sports: Boys & Girls Basketball, Boys & Girls Bowling, Girls Flag Football, and Wrestling.
Spring sports: Baseball, Boys Golf, Softball, Boys & Girls Swimming and Diving, Boys & Girls Track and Field, and Boys Volleyball.

Nevada Interscholastic Activities Association State Championships
Baseball – 2005, 2016, 2018, 2020
Volleyball – 2004, 2016
Robotics - 2014, 2015, 2016, 2017, 2018
Bowling - 2016, 2019

Extracurricular awards

Sierra Vista was approved in February 2016 to be the first public high school in CCSD history to receive solar panels and LED lights. They are currently undergoing construction to this day.
Sierra Vista's robotics team has gone to 10 world championships - five in the VEX Robotics Competition and three in FIRST Robotics Competition. They are currently the Nevada State Champions with their best robot going 11-0 at the Nevada State Championship. It greatest success was in the 2017 Competition Season, winning 19 awards.

Robotics
There are two robotics platforms at Sierra Vista High School the VEX Robotics Competition and the FIRST Robotics Competition. In 2017, the FIRST Robotics Team competed at the FIRST Championship and were Division Finalist. The VEX Robotics Team won 19 awards in 2017, including the Tournament Champions of Nevada. The VEX Robotics Team also competed at the VEX Robotics World Championships in Louisville, Kentucky, where they won the Community Award.

World Championship Bids (VEX)
 
2019 (World Championships Bid)
2018 (Excellence Award Winner)
2017 (2 Robots Qualified) (Nevada Tournament Champions, Tournament Skills Champions )
2016 (Tournament Skills Champions.)
2014 (Excellence Award Winners)

World Championship Bids (FRC) 
2015 (Rookie-All Star @ LV Regional)

Band
The band program is led by Miss Melissa Bushee. During the marching season, Brooke Tomas is co-director. 
The bands offered are: Marching Band, Winter Percussion, Winterguard, Jazz Band, and Concert Band. The Concert Band was recently split into Advanced and Intermediate Bands to give "rookie" members (typically freshmen and some upperclassmen who recently have learned instruments) of the band a place to thrive with kids at their own age and skill level until they are comfortable enough to proceed with the audition process into Advanced Band.

The Sierra Vista Wind Ensemble has achieved multiple Superior ratings at various festivals in and around Clark County.

The Marching Band currently consists of roughly 106 members, including Drum Majors Jordyn Jory (senior) & Ian Parlier (junior) and Colorguard Captains Piper Sevesind (senior) and Gianna Portale (junior).

The Winter Drumline program began in 2015, and is led by Percussion Instructor Noah Ganon. The Sierra Vista Winter Colorguard is led by Liana Ham with additional instruction by Brittany Ames and Taylur Haynie.

The school's marching band won the 2007 Bands of America Regional Championships held in Flagstaff, Arizona. SVHS was the first Nevada high school to win the regional championship.

Army JROTC 
The Army Junior Reserve Officers' Training Corps is instructed by Senior Army Instructor CW4 (Ret) Loyd Crathers and Army Instructor CSM (Ret) Robert Brown. The program was initiated in the 2016-2017 school year and has a strength of approximately 189 cadets.

Notable alumni
 Chris Carter: Professional Baseball Player
 Sophia Omotola Omidiji: Professional Women's Soccer Player
 Jake Hager: Baseball Player
 Nick Kingham: Baseball Player
 Bryan Le (RiceGum): American YouTuber/Influencer

Feeder schools
Tony Alamo Elementary School 
Mark L. Fine Elementary School
Judith D. Steele Elementary School
Wayne Tanaka Elementary School
Robert L. Forbuss Elementary School 
William V. Wright Elementary School
Kathy L. Batterman Elementary School
Wilbur & Theresa Faiss Middle School
Don & Dee Snyder Elementary School

References

External links
Sierra Vista High School
Clark County School District

Clark County School District
2001 establishments in Nevada
Educational institutions established in 2001
Buildings and structures in Spring Valley, Nevada
Public high schools in Nevada